Patrick Kojo Asmah (born 25 January 1996) is a Ghanaian footballer who plays as a defender.

References

External links
 
 whoscored.com
 
 goal.com
 myjoyonline.com
 modernghana.com
 fifaindex.com
 ghanasportsonline.com

Ghanaian footballers
Serie B players
1996 births
Living people
Atalanta B.C. players
U.S. Avellino 1912 players
U.S. Salernitana 1919 players
FK Senica players
Slovak Super Liga players
Ghanaian expatriate footballers
Ghanaian expatriate sportspeople in Italy
Ghanaian expatriate sportspeople in Slovakia
Expatriate footballers in Italy
Expatriate footballers in Slovakia
Association football defenders
Ghana international footballers